Marcgravia grandifolia is a species of plant in the Marcgraviaceae family. It is endemic to Ecuador.

Ecology
The plant's natural habitat is subtropical or tropical moist lowland forests.

The green-crowned brilliant hummingbird feeds at the large inflorescences of the Marcgravia grandifolia vine.

References

grandifolia
Endemic flora of Ecuador
Endangered plants
Bird food plants
Vines
Taxonomy articles created by Polbot